The Pereschivul Mic is a left tributary of the river Pereschiv in Romania. It flows into the Pereschiv near Fichitești.

References

Rivers of Romania
Rivers of Bacău County
Rivers of Vaslui County